Mullen is a former settlement in Yolo County, California. A 1913 book described Mullen, along with Merritt, as farming towns along the main automobile route from Davis to Woodland. It still appeared on maps as of 1915.

References

External links

Former settlements in Yolo County, California
Former populated places in California